This is a list of Canada's 338 federal electoral districts (also known as ridings in Canadian English) as defined by the 2013 Representation Order, which came into effect on August 2, 2015.  The ridings are organized by province. But a click on tabs can re-order them based on riding size or population.

Population 2011-2021

2021 electoral population and ridings by province/territory 
On October 15th 2021, the Chief Electoral Officer calculated the House of Commons seats to be allocated to each province using the representation formula found in the Constitution and the population estimates provided by Statistics Canada.
This seat allocation will only take effect when a new representation order comes into force. Consult the federal redistribution timeline to find out more.

Allocation of Seats in the House of Commons after the 2021 census 
Will take effect when the representation order comes into force

References 
 Elections Canada
 Statistics Canada - Population and dwelling counts: Canada and federal electoral districts (2013 Representation Order)

Canadian federal electoral districts